Robert Campbell (born 22 July 1986 in Glasgow) is a former Scottish footballer 

He is a left-sided forward and was part of the Kilmarnock side which won the Scottish Youth Cup in 2004, with Campbell himself scoring the winner. He had loan spells with Dundee and Dumbarton before leaving by mutual agreement. After a successful trial with Queen of the South, he signed for them until the end of the 2007-08 season. He was released at the end of his contract and subsequently signed for East Fife in June 2008. He joined Annan on loan in February 2009 for the rest of the season. At the end of the season he left East Fife due to injury problems. Robert also made 11 appearances for Scotland U19s with archie gemmel and tommy johnson as coaching staff

External links

1986 births
Living people
Scottish footballers
Scottish Premier League players
Scottish Football League players
Kilmarnock F.C. players
Dundee F.C. players
Dumbarton F.C. players
Queen of the South F.C. players
East Fife F.C. players
Annan Athletic F.C. players
Association football forwards